RAB Racing with Brack Maggard was an American professional stock car racing team that attempted NASCAR Sprint Cup Series, Xfinity Series, Camping World Truck Series and the ARCA Racing Series. The team was co-owned by Robert A. Benton Sr. and his son Robert Benton Jr. along with Georgia businessman Brack Maggard and ran from 2005 through 2014. The team won one race in the Xfinity Series, but never qualified for a Cup Series race in eight attempts.

Kenny Wallace drove the most Xfinity races for the team with 57 starts, while Boris Said scored the team's only Xfinity win in 2010.

Sprint Cup Series

Car No. 29 history
RAB Racing entered the No. 09 Cup car for Kenny Wallace in the 2012 Daytona 500 with sponsorship from American Ethanol. The team suffered ECU problems in the Duels and failed to qualify. RAB Racing next fielded a Cup car at the 2014 Coke Zero 400. Joe Nemechek attempted qualify the No. 29, but did not qualify. Later in the summer, Matt Crafton attempted to make both his and RAB's first Cup race in the No. 29 at Indianapolis for the Brickyard 400, but posted the slowest time and failed to qualify.  In the GEICO 500, RAB made their third attempt of the season with the No. 29, once again using Nemechek.  Despite initially running 24th after making it to round two but declining to run in the round, they failed to qualify again after the car failed post-qualifying inspection.

Justin Marks attempted to qualify the No. 29 for the 2015 Daytona 500, bringing American Born Moonshine on board as part of a package deal across all three national series at Daytona. RAB also announced its plans to attempt the full Cup Series schedule. However, Marks failed to qualify. Reed Sorenson joined the team for the Folds of Honor QuikTrip 500, but failed to qualify after the No. 29 was one of thirteen cars that was unable to clear pre-qualifying inspection in time to make a run. Sorenson then missed the next race at Las Vegas.  RAB withdrew from Phoenix but announced they would return at Auto Club, where Sorenson once again failed to qualify.

RAB has failed to qualify in each of their first 8 Cup attempts.

Car No. 29 results

Xfinity Series

Car No. 29 history
The second RAB car made its debut at the STP 300 at Chicago in 2012 as the second iteration of the No. 09. Kenny Wallace, who gave up his seat in the team's full-time 99 car due to lack of sponsorship, finished 4th in the race. In 2013, Wallace returned to drive a limited schedule of races in the renumbered 29 car. Alex Bowman, the full-time driver of the main No. 99 car, was set to drive one of two RAB cars at the season finale at Homestead, but his sponsor pulled out and the team released him.

In 2014, Scott Lagasse Jr. drove at both Daytona races with "Alert Today, Alive Tomorrow" as the sponsor. Kenny Wallace ran a single race at Iowa Speedway with U.S. Cellular as his sponsor, starting and finishing 19th. Kelly Admiraal ran three races with a best finish of 22nd twice. In August, Milka Duno signed with the team to run select events, only qualifying for two races out of five attempts (Duno ran the season-finale at Homestead using the owners points of NEMCO Motorsports and Rick Ware Racing's 87 team). Joe Gibbs Racing driver Daniel Suárez ran the 29 with sponsor Arris Group at Chicagoland Speedway in September, scoring a season's-best 15th-place finish.

In 2015, Justin Marks ran the season-opening race at Daytona with sponsor American Born Moonshine, qualifying on the outside pole, but finishing 34th after a crash. Kenny Wallace returned with the team at Iowa Speedway with the sponsorship U.S. Cellular, finishing 23rd. This would be RAB Racing final race as they later shut down their operations for the rest of the season.

Car No. 29 results

Car No. 99 History

RAB moved up from the ARCA Racing Series to the NASCAR Nationwide Series for 2008, hiring John Wes Townley to drive seven races (in addition to the full ARCA schedule). Townley brought his family's Zaxby's sponsorship on board, and team changed manufacturers to Ford. Townley's new number would be 09. The team qualified for only three of their 7 scheduled races, with a best finish of 27th in Charlotte.

In 2009, RAB moved up to the Nationwide Series full-time, running with Townley for Rookie of the Year honors. Townley had a decent year, finishing 23rd in points but amassing no top-15 finishes. Also in 2009, RAB hired Boris Said to run at Watkins Glen and Montreal with a best finish of 11th at The Glen. Travis Kvapil ran at Richmond and finished 20th.

Townley left RAB at the end of 2009 for Richard Childress Racing, and the team announced it would run as much of the 2010 season as possible with Scott Riggs. However, the team only ran the first five races of the year before replacing Riggs with many other drivers including Jason Bowles, Chad McCumbee, Patrick Sheltra, Hermie Sadler, Sean Caisse, Robb Brent, Ken Schrader, Kevin Hamlin, and Landon Cassill. "Road Course Ringer" Boris Said drove for RAB at Watkins Glen and Montreal. In Montreal at Circuit Gilles Villeneuve, Said held off another road course ace, Max Papis, in a photo finish to give RAB its first win in any division. Townley returned to the team for a few races, but left before Richmond. The team then hired former Braun Racing driver Brian Scott to drive the No. 09 car at Kansas. Scott drove the rest of the season and finished runner-up to Ricky Stenhouse Jr. for ROTY. Scott left for Joe Gibbs Racing at the end of the season.

For 2011, the team hired veteran Kenny Wallace from Jay Robinson Racing, with Wallace driving without salary in exchange for being in good equipment. Wallace brought sponsorship from Family Farmers/American Ethanol, University of Northwestern Ohio, and Federated Auto Parts. Wallace and RAB would take home 11 top-10s and finish 7th in points. For 2012, Wallace returned to the team for the first few races with sponsorship from American Ethanol/Family Farmers. After campaigning for weeks, he was forced to run a part-time schedule due to sponsorship issues. Meanwhile, the 09 was renumbered 99 in a deal with Michael Waltrip Racing to allow Travis Pastrana to run his seven scheduled Nationwide races. The rest of the year was split among Wallace, Townley, Ryan Truex (former driver of the 99 with MWR), Alex Bowman, Victor Gonzalez Jr., Patrick Carpentier and Brett Moffitt (also MWR drivers). Wallace would grab the team's best finish of 4th at Chicagoland.

In January 2013, it was announced that Alex Bowman would be running the full 2013 Nationwide Series season for RAB Racing, competing for Rookie of the Year honors. In April, he would win his first career Nationwide pole at the O'Reilly Auto Parts 300 at Texas. He would sweep the poles at Texas but would be released prior to the season finale at Homestead-Miami due to lack of sponsorship. Blake Koch would drive the 99 at Homestead to a 13th-place finish.

For 2014, former Camping World Truck Series champion James Buescher left Turner Scott Motorsports to run the full season in the No. 99 car, bringing sponsor Rheem. After the Drive to Stop Diabetes 300 at Bristol, the 99 was penalized for violating two sections of the NASCAR rulebook: 12-1 (actions detrimental to stock car racing) and 20A-2.3A (added car weight; improperly attached weight; loss of weight during the event); crew chief Chris Rice and car chief John Guerra were placed on probation until December 31, the former also being fined $10,000. Buescher struggled throughout the season, posting only two top 10s and finishing 10th in points. The team was forced to shut down after Rheem left for Richard Childress Racing.

Car No. 99 results

Camping World Truck Series

For 2012, RAB formed a Camping World Truck Series team with longtime driver John Wes Townley, using the number 09. However, Townley was cited with a DUI before Speedweeks, resulting in his suspension by RAB. Townley was replaced by Travis Kvapil for Daytona. Townley returned the next race, at Martinsville. After competing for Rookie of the Year honors in 2012 and collecting his best series finish of eighth at Pocono Raceway, Townley left the team and joined Red Horse Racing for 2013.

ARCA Re/Max Series
After leaving the drivers seat and having an eight-year stint as a crew member for Robert Yates Racing, Robert Benton decided to start his own race team in 2005 in the ARCA RE/Max Series. The team first hired young Georgia native Walt Brannen to drive their No. 65 for a few races with little success. Brannen was released as RAB stepped up to a full-time schedule with Justin Marks and Damon Lusk splitting the No. 65 Construct Corps/Crocs Dodge. The duo would earn a pole, two top fives and nine top tens. Marks ran the full 2007 season with RAB and ended the season fifth in points with a pole, four top fives, and ten top tens. Marks would move to Germain Racing in the Craftsman Truck Series for 2008.

For 2008, John Wes Townley ran the renumbered 09 car with sponsor Zaxby's, scoring 8 top tens and ending the season 7th in points. Townley ran the two restrictor plate races in 2009, with a best finish of 4th at Daytona. Grant Enfinger and Tom Hessert III also ran races in the car.

See also
 Tyler Allen – RAB Racing engineer

References

External links
 
 

American auto racing teams
Companies based in North Carolina
Defunct NASCAR teams
ARCA Menards Series teams
Auto racing teams established in 2005
Auto racing teams disestablished in 2015